Tor Gustav Ebbe Levin (born 10 September 1952 in Sigtuna, Sweden) is a Swedish actor. He studied at Skara Skolscen and later at the Swedish National Academy of Mime and Acting.

Filmography

Film
 Pillertrillaren (1994)
 The Christmas Oratorio (1996)
 Under ytan (1997)
 Hamilton (1998)
 Miffo (2003)
 Van Veeteren: Moreno och tystnaden (2006)
 Offside (2006)
 Beck – I Guds namn (2007)
 Cockpit (2012)

Television
 Tre kärlekar (1989)
 Snoken (1993-1996)
 Skärgårdsdoktorn (1997)
 Woman with Birthmark (2001)
 Tusenbröder (2002)
 Oskyldigt dömd (2008)

External links
 Swedish Film Database
 
 

1952 births
People from Sigtuna Municipality
Living people
Swedish male actors